Bofilliella  is a genus of small, very elongate, air-breathing land snails, terrestrial pulmonate gastropod mollusks in the family Clausiliidae, the door snails, all of which have a clausilium. It is named in honour of Spanish (Catalan) geologist and malacologist .

Species
Species within the genus Bofilliella include:

 Bofilliella subarcuata

References

 
Clausiliidae
Taxonomy articles created by Polbot